Deevinchandi  is a 2001 Indian Telugu language film directed by  Muthyala Subbaiah and produced by Ramoji Rao under Ushakiran Movies. The film stars Srikanth, Raasi and Malavika.

Cast
 Srikanth as Shiva
 Raasi as Lakshmi
 Malavika as Swetha
 Master Sajja Teja as Siva's son
 Narra Venkateswara Rao as Police officer
 Brahmanandam

Music

The music was composed by S. A. Rajkumar.

References

External links

2001 films
2000s Telugu-language films
Films directed by Muthyala Subbaiah